Puncha may refer to:
 Puncha (community development block), an administrative division in Purulia Sadar East, West Bengal, India
 Puncha, Purulia, a village, with a police station, in Purulia district, West Bengal, India. 
 Puncha (snakefly), a genus of snakeflies in the family Raphidiidae 
 Puncha ratzeburgi, a species of snakeflies in the family Raphidiidae

See also
 Punacha